Owston's palm civet (Chrotogale owstoni) is a civet native to Vietnam, Laos and southern China. It is listed as Endangered by IUCN because of an ongoing population decline, estimated to be more than 50% over the last three generations, inferred from over-exploitation, habitat destruction and degradation.

Chrotogale is a monospecific genus. Owston's palm civet is named after the wildlife collector Alan Owston.

Characteristics 
The Owston's palm civet is a mid-sized palm civet at 57 cm (23 in), plus a tail of 43 cm (17 in). With its pointed face, it is sometimes thought to resemble a large insectivore, such as a shrew. It has a tawny buff-grey body with highly contrasted black markings on its back and tail. They usually only have 4 bands on their back. The last two-thirds of the tail is completely black. They look somewhat like the banded palm civet, Hemigalus derbyanus, except for that the hair on the back of their neck are not reversed, and the Owston's has spots on its legs.

Distribution and habitat 
Owston's palm civet lives in the forests and wooded lowland river basins of northern Vietnam, northern Laos and southern China.

Ecology and behaviour 
Very little is known about their life history in the wild, though limited information has been gathered on captive animals. They feed mostly on earthworms and other invertebrates. The mating season is apparently in late January. After a gestation period of 3 months, a litter of 1-3 young are born.

Conservation

In captivity 
The Carnivore and Pangolin Conservation Program, based at Cúc Phương National Park in Vietnam, runs an international conservation and breeding programme for them in cooperation with various zoos including Newquay Zoo.

References

External links
BBC - Rare civets born at Newquay zoo

Viverrids
Carnivorans of Asia
Mammals of Laos
Mammals of Vietnam
Mammals of China
Endangered fauna of Asia
Mammals described in 1912
Taxa named by Oldfield Thomas
Endangered Fauna of China